is a Peruvian international school (ペルー学校) in Nishi-ku, Hamamatsu, Japan. The school, which has primary and secondary levels, uses Spanish as the medium of instruction. In 2013 the Embassy of Peru celebrated the school's 10 year anniversary.

The school also has a Brazilian primary school section.

See also

 Peruvian migration to Japan
 Brazilians in Japan
 Hamamatsu Municipal Senior High School - Japanese municipal high school with a large non-Japanese enrollment
 Colegio Hispano Americano de Gunma - Peruvian international school in Isesaki, Gunma
 Asociación Academia de Cultura Japonesa (Japanese international school in Lima, Peru)
Japanese international schools in Brazil:
 Escola Japonesa de São Paulo
 Associação Civil de Divulgação Cultural e Educacional Japonesa do Rio de Janeiro
 Escola Japonesa de Manaus

References

Further reading
 "La prensa japonesa destaca a la peruana de “Mundo de Alegría” que ingresó a la universidad" (Archive). International Press Digital. 31 October 2014.

External links
  Mundo de Alegría
  Mundo de Alegría
  Mundo de Alegría

Elementary schools in Japan
Schools in Hamamatsu
International schools in Japan
High schools in Shizuoka Prefecture
Brazilian international schools
Peruvian international schools
Brazil–Japan relations